Karim Maroc (born 5 March 1958) is a former Algerian international football player. He spent the majority of his club career in France with various clubs including Olympique Lyon and Stade Brestois. He finished his career in Oran, Algeria playing with MC Oran.

International career
Maroc was a member of the Algerian National Team at the 1982 FIFA World Cup in Spain and the 1986 FIFA World Cup in Mexico. He participated too in the 1986 African Cup of Nations in Egypt.

Honours
 Winner of Algerian Championnat National 1988 with MC Oran
 Runner-up of the African Cup of Champions Clubs 1989 with MC Oran

References

External links
 Stats

Living people
1958 births
People from Aïn Témouchent Province
Algerian footballers
Algerian expatriate footballers
Algeria international footballers
Expatriate footballers in France
Algerian expatriate sportspeople in France
Expatriate footballers in Spain
Algerian expatriate sportspeople in Spain
Olympique Lyonnais players
Angers SCO players
Tours FC players
Stade Brestois 29 players
Montpellier HSC players
CD Logroñés footballers
Ligue 1 players
Ligue 2 players
Segunda División players
1982 FIFA World Cup players
1986 FIFA World Cup players
1986 African Cup of Nations players
MC Oran players
Association football midfielders
21st-century Algerian people